David Barrett (born December 22, 1977) is a former American football cornerback who played nine seasons in the National Football League. He was drafted by the Arizona Cardinals in the fourth round of the 2000 NFL Draft. He played college football at Arkansas. He went to school and graduated from Osceola High School where he excelled in football.

Barrett also played for the New York Jets.

College career
Barrett played college football for the Arkansas Razorbacks. During his college career, he had a total of 176 tackles, 7 interceptions, 3 forced fumbles and 5 sacks. He majored in architecture.

Professional career

Arizona Cardinals
Barrett was selected by the Arizona Cardinals in the fourth round (102nd overall) in the 2000 NFL Draft. He played for them until 2003.

New York Jets
In 2004, David Barrett signed with the New York Jets and became the team's starting cornerback. In 2005, he had five interceptions. However, by 2007 he had lost his starting job to Hank Poteat.

On February 10, 2009, Barrett was released by the Jets.

Personal
In 1979, his mother, Willie Ann Rucker, disappeared and has never been found. Barrett appeared in ABC’s Extreme Makeover: Home Edition in 2006, with teammate Adrian Jones, to help build a new home for the Llanes family.  His wife Sheila works as a curator for the Jefferson Davis museum in Waterloo.

References

1977 births
Living people
Sportspeople from Waterloo, Iowa
Players of American football from Iowa
African-American players of American football
American football cornerbacks
Arkansas Razorbacks football players
Arizona Cardinals players
New York Jets players
21st-century African-American sportspeople
20th-century African-American sportspeople